Dierdorf is a Verbandsgemeinde ("collective municipality") in the district of Neuwied, in Rhineland-Palatinate, Germany. The seat of the Verbandsgemeinde is in Dierdorf.

The Verbandsgemeinde Dierdorf consists of the following Ortsgemeinden ("local municipalities"):

 Dierdorf 
 Großmaischeid 
 Isenburg 
 Kleinmaischeid 
 Marienhausen 
 Stebach

Verbandsgemeinde in Rhineland-Palatinate